Ghost show may refer to:

Arts and entertainment
 Midnight ghost show, traveling horror-themed stage shows popular from the 1930s to the 1970s
 Paranormal television, a genre of reality television

See also
 Ghost (disambiguation)